Canada Post Corporation, trading as Canada Post, is a Crown corporation that functions as the primary postal operator in Canada.  Originally known as Royal Mail Canada (the operating name of the Post Office Department of the Canadian government founded in 1867), rebranding was done to the "Canada Post" name in the late 1960s, even though it had not yet been separated from the government. On October 16, 1981, the Canada Post Corporation Act came into effect. This abolished the Post Office Department and created the present-day Crown corporation which provides postal service. The act aimed to set a new direction for the postal service by ensuring the postal service's financial security and independence.

Canada Post provided service to more than 16 million addresses and delivered nearly 8.4 billion items in 2016 and consolidated revenue from operations reached $7.88 billion. Delivery takes place via traditional "to the door" service and centralized delivery by 25,000 letter carriers, through a 13,000 vehicle fleet. There are more than 6,200 post offices across the country, a combination of corporate offices and private franchises that are operated by retailers, such as drugstores. In terms of area serviced, Canada Post delivers to a larger area than the postal service of any other nation, including Russia (where Russian Post service in Siberia is limited largely to communities along the railway).  As of 2004, nearly 843,000 rural Canadian customers received residential mail delivery services.

Canada Post operates as a group of companies called The Canada Post Group. It employs approximately 64,000 full and part-time employees. The Corporation holds an interest in Purolator Courier, Innovapost, Progistix-Solutions and Canada Post International Limited.  In 2000, Canada Post created a company called Epost, allowed customers to receive their bills from participating merchants and institutions online for free. In 2007, Epost was absorbed into Canada Post. In early 2022, Canada Post announced that the Epost service would be discontinued at the end of the year.

Canada Post (French: Postes Canada) is the Federal Identity Program name. The legal name is Canada Post Corporation in English and Société canadienne des postes in French. During the late 1980s and much of the 1990s, the short forms used in the corporation's logo were "Mail" (English) and "Poste" (French), rendered as  "Poste Mail" in Québec and "Mail Poste" in the other provinces. Although English-language advertising also still referred to the corporation as "Canada Post".

History

On August 3, 1527, in St. John's, Newfoundland, the first known letter was sent from present day Canada. While in St. John's, John Rut wrote a letter to King Henry VIII about his findings and planned voyage. Mail delivery within Canada first started in 1693 when the Portuguese-born Pedro da Silva was paid to deliver between Québec City and Montréal. Official postal services began in 1775, under the control of the British Government up to 1851. The first postage stamp (designed by Sandford Fleming) went into circulation in Canada that same year. It was not until 1867 when the newly formed Canada created the Post Office Department as a federal government department (The Act for the Regulation of the Postal Service) headed by a Cabinet minister, the Postmaster General of Canada. The Act took effect on April 1, 1868, providing uniform postal service throughout the newly established dominion. The Canadian post office was designed around the British service as created by Rowland Hill, who introduced the concept of charging mail by weight and not destination along with creating the concept of the postage stamp. The new service traded under the name The Royal Mail Canada.

Prior to rural mail delivery, many Canadians living outside major cities and towns had little communication with the outside world. On October 10, 1908 the first free rural mail delivery service was instituted in Canada.  The extension of residential mail delivery services to all rural Canadian residents was a major achievement for the Post Office Department.

The Post Office Department was an early pioneer of airmail delivery, with the first airmail flight taking place on June 24, 1918, carrying mail from Montreal to Toronto. A modern plaque at the site of Leaside Aerodrome reads: "At 10:12 a.m. on June 24, 1918, Captain Brian Peck of the Royal Air Force (RAF) and mechanic Corporal C.W. Mathers took off from the Bois Franc Polo Grounds in Montreal in a JN-4 Curtiss two-seater airplane. They had with them the first bag of mail to be delivered by air in Canada. Wind and rain buffeted the small plane and forced it to make refuelling stops at Kingston and Deseronto. Finally, at 4:55 p.m., Peck and Mathers landed at the Leaside Aerodrome (immediately southwest of here). The flight had been arranged by a civilian organization, the Aerial League of the British Empire, to demonstrate that aviation was the way of the future." A regular air express service began in 1928.

The Post Office Savings Bank system, an agency created by the April 1868 Post Office Act, was phased out in 1968–69.

The 1970s was a difficult decade for the Post Office, with major strikes combined with annual deficits that had hit $600 million by 1981. This state of affairs made politicians want to rethink their strategy for the federal department. It resulted in two years of public debate and input into the future of mail delivery in Canada. The government sought to give the post office more autonomy, in order to make it more commercially viable and to compete against the new threat of private courier services. On October 16, 1981, the Federal Parliament passed the "Canada Post Corporation Act", which transformed Canada Post into a Crown corporation to create the Canada Post Corporation (CPC). The legislation also includes a measure that legally guarantees basic postal service to all Canadians. It stipulates that all Canadians have the right to expect mail delivery, regardless of where they live.

Several historical sites related to the history of the Post Office Department of Canada can be visited today. In Ontario, the first Toronto Post Office is still in operation. The site of Scotiabank Arena was once the Canada Post Delivery Building. Also notable are the Vancouver Main Post Office and the Dawson, Yukon, Post Office, a National Historic Site of Canada. In Peggys Cove, Nova Scotia, a nineteenth-century lighthouse acts as a seasonal post office for the tiny coastal community.

Timeline

Mail format

Any letter sent within Canada has the destination address on the centre of its envelope, with a stamp, postal indicia, meter label, or frank mark on the top-right corner of the envelope to acknowledge payment of postage. A return address, although it is not required, can be put on the top-left corner or the back of the envelope in smaller type than the destination address.

Official addressing protocol is for the address to be in block letters, using a fixed-pitch typeface (such as Courier). The first line(s) of the address contain(s) the personal name and internal address of the recipient. The second-to-last line is the post office box, general delivery indicator, or street address, using the shortened name of the street type and no punctuation. The last line consists of the legal place name, a single space, the two-letter province abbreviation, two full spaces, and then the postal code. The country designation is unnecessary if mailed within Canada.

Fictitious examples:

Major products and services

The Corporation has a directory of all its products and services called the Postal Guide and has divided its range of services into three main categories: Transaction Mail, Parcels and Direct Marketing.

Transaction mail
The lettermail service allows the transmission of virtually any paper document. The 2015 to 2018 rate was 85 cents for a standard letter (30 g or less) and $1.20 for a letter between 30 g and 50 g. Proposed change for 2019 is 90 cents and $1.27 for these rates. Rates usually increase in mid-January of each year; for ordinary letters (30 g or less). The rate was regulated by a price-cap formula, linked to the inflation rate. The Corporation now has a "permanent" stamp that is valued at the domestic rate forever, eliminating the need to buy 1 cent stamps after a rate increase. The rates for lettermail are based on weight and size and determine whether the article falls into the aforementioned standard format or in the oversize one.

The Canada Post website documents standards for delivery within Canada:
Lettermail
Priority™ Delivery Standards

Daily cross-country airmail services were introduced in 1939.  Canadian municipal delivery service standards are two days, as seen on the Lettermail Delivery Standards Grid.

Mail sent internationally is known as letter-post. It can only contain paper documents (See "Small Packet" below). From 2015 to 2018 the rate for a standard letter is $1.20 if sent to the United States and $2.50 if sent to any other destination.

Parcels

Domestic
Canada Post offers four domestic parcel services. The rates are based on distance, weight, and size. The maximum acceptable weight is 30 kg.

International

Small Packet
 Air and surface services are available.
 Maximum weight is 1 kg (USA) and 2 kg (International).
 No on time guarantee
 No ability to make a trace or investigation if it is lost or delayed

Expedited Parcel USA
Available for items sent to the United States only.
Despite its name, does not provide any service guarantee.
The maximum acceptable weight is 30 kg
It is cheaper than the standard international rate.
Handed off to the USPS as Priority Mail.

Xpresspost-USA and International
Provides speedy and guaranteed delivery to addresses in the United States.
Provides accelerated delivery to certain countries.
Maximum weight is 30 kg (USA) and 20 to 30 kg (depending on the international destination).
Handed off to the USPS / other postal administrations as Priority Mail Express / EMS.

International Parcel
 Air and surface service available
 Provides delivery to countries to which Xpresspost is not available
 No on time guarantee

Priority Worldwide
Partnered with FedEx Corporation
Delivers overnight to the US and to more than 220 countries in 2–3 business days with detailed tracking

Direct marketing

Personalized Mail
Promotional mailings targeted to specific residents.
Minimum quantity of 1,000 articles.

Neighbourhood Mail
Consists of printed matter and product samples that are not addressed to specific delivery addresses in Canada, but to specific neighbourhoods or cities.

Snap Admail
On September 22, 2014, Canada Post unveiled Snap Admail™, an all-in-one online tool that is aimed to support small businesses in the creation and execution of direct-marketing campaigns.

E-Commerce

Canada Post store

Canada Post operates a store front that sells a variety of stamps, and postal supplies to the public. The personal shop is focused on nominal postage, shipping supplies, and prepaid envelopes while the collectors shop has a selection of limited edition definitive and commemorative stamps as well as coins.

Comparison shopping
On October 26, 2010, Canada Post launched a comparison shopping service for Canadians. This service, Canada Post Comparison Shopper, allowed shoppers to find and compare product available to Canadians from over 500 stores across the USA and Canada. Notable features included price comparison, store policy information, cross-border shipping, duties and fees estimation, price history charts, reviews and color search ability. As of October 2012 the Comparison Shopper service is no longer available.

Issue of stamps

Although Canada Post is responsible for stamp design and production, the corporation does not actually choose the subjects or the final designs that appear on stamps. That task falls under the jurisdiction of the Stamp Advisory Committee. Their objective is to recommend a stamp program that will have broad-based appeal, regionally and culturally, reflecting Canadian history, heritage, and tradition.

Before Canada Post calls a meeting of the committee, it also welcomes suggestions for stamp subjects from Canadian citizens. Ideas for subjects that have recently appeared on a stamp are declined. The committee works two years in advance and can approve approximately 20 subjects for each year.

Once a stamp subject is selected, Canada Post's Stamp Products group conducts research. Designs are commissioned from two firms, both chosen for their expertise. The designs are presented anonymously to the committee. The committee's process and selection policy have changed little in the thirty years since it was introduced.

Notable stamps include Canadian definitive postage stamps like the Queen Elizabeth II definitive stamps, the Canada Post millennium stamps, and an assortment of ice hockey and Olympic stamps.

Tracking numbers and barcodes

Canada Post use 13 digit alphanumeric tracking numbers / barcodes for their pre-printed labels.  Bar codes consist of two letters, followed by eight sequence digits, and a ninth digit which is the check digit. The first two letters are the type of service (RN for registered mail, PG for express post envelopes). The last two characters are the letters CA.  The check digit ignores the letters and only concern itself with the first 8 numeric digits. The scheme is to multiply each of those 8 digits by a different weighting factor, (8 6 4 2 3 5 9 7). Add up the total of all of these multiplications and divide by 11.  The remainder after dividing by 11 gives a number from 0 to 10. Subtracting this from 11 gives a number from 1 to 11.  That result is the check digit, except in the two cases where it is 10 or 11.  If 10 it is then changed to a 0, and if 11 then it is changed to a 5.  The check digit may be used to verify if a barcode scan is correct, or if a manual entry of the barcode is correct. The system of barcode digit checking is referred to as Modulo 11 or Modulus 11 digit calculation.

Canada Post use 16 digit numeric tracking numbers / barcodes for parcels that originate from a Canada Post post office. The first 7 digits are the reference numbers for the specific post office that the package originated. A Modulus 10 digit calculation is used to verify that the barcode has been read correctly, also referred to as the Luhn algorithm. USPS and Canada Post both use the same system to verify the barcodes, with a difference that USPS uses a 20 digit numeric tracking number. These types of barcodes are referred to as GS1-128.

Management and organization

In 1981, Canada Post became a Crown Corporation with a CEO and President:
Michael Warren
1981-1985 - appointed by Pierre Trudeau 
Donald Harley Lander
1986-1992 - Chair 1993-? - appointed by Mulroney and business executive; deceased (2010)
Georges Clermont
1993-1998 - appointed by Campbell; now CEO of International Post
André Ouellet
1999–2004 - appointed by Jean Chretien and former Minister in charge of Canada Post (as Postmaster General); Chair 1996-2004
Moya Greene 
2004–2010 - appointed by Paul Martin and left to become CEO of Royal Mail. 
Stewart Bacon
2010 - appointed interim CEO by Stephen Harper following Greene's departure 
Deepak Chopra
2011–2018 - appointed by Stephen Harper
 Jessica McDonald

April 2, 2018  -March 4, 2019- Interim appointment by the Canada Post Board of Directors

Doug Ettinger

March 4, 2019 - Present

Ombudsman
The Office of the Ombudsman at Canada Post was created in October 1997 as a result of the 1995 Canada Post Mandate Review conducted by an Advisory Panel appointed by the Canadian government.

The Ombudsman is the final appeal authority in resolving postal service complaints. If a complaint is not resolved to the customer's satisfaction by Canada Post, the customer can appeal to the Ombudsman. Although the Ombudsman has no legislative power over the Corporation, the recommendations that the office makes to Canada Post can help improve company processes, amend policies and reinforce compliance with procedures.

The Ombudsman is independent of Canada Post staff and management, reporting directly to the Chairman of the Board of Directors. Mrs. Francine Conn was appointed on July 11, 2011, as the fourth and current Ombudsman at Canada Post. The services offered by the Office of the Ombudsman are free of charge.

Organizational issues

Attempt to phase out door-to-door delivery

In 2014, Canada Post began to phase out door-to-door service in urban centres, in favour of community mailboxes—a process that was estimated to affect 32% of Canadian addresses (subdivisions built after 1985 already use community mailboxes, and customers using rural mailboxes would not be affected). This change was instituted by Stephen Harper's Conservative government, and was meant to be a cost-cutting measure in the face of financial losses, due primarily to the decreased use of traditional mail in favour of electronic alternatives.

The plan proved controversial, and the CUPW criticized the move, which was expected to result in the loss of at least 8,000 jobs, by arguing that Canada Post should have attempted to expand its services to include new offerings, such as postal banking, rather than cutting jobs and reducing services. In 2015, the CUPW filed a federal lawsuit demanding that the roll-out be suspended—an action endorsed by Mayor of Montreal Denis Coderre. Concerns were also raised about the effect of the change on seniors and people with disabilities. During the 2015 Canadian federal election campaign, Liberal leader Justin Trudeau promised to halt the cutbacks at Canada Post and the shift to community mailboxes.

On October 26, 2015, following Trudeau's victory in the election, Canada Post announced that it would place the discontinuation of door-to-door delivery "on hold in an orderly fashion" and that it would collaborate with the government on evaluating the future of the mail system in Canada. On January 24, 2018, the Liberal government announced that it had officially halted the future deployment of community mailboxes, and will focus on finding other methods of expanding Canada Post's services in the future. Canada Post will not reintroduce door-to-door delivery in areas where it was discontinued prior to April 15, 2016, but stated that an advisory panel would assist in addressing related accessibility issues.

Labour relations
Canada Post has a history of troubled labour relations with its trade unions, particularly the  Canadian Union of Postal Workers (CUPW) and the Letter Carriers Union of Canada (which merged with CUPW in 1989), culminating in periodic strike action that has halted mail service in Canada on different occasions. There have been at least 19 strikes, lockouts, and walkouts between 1965 and 1997, including several wildcat strikes. A number of these strikes since the 1970s have seen the corporation employ strikebreakers, resulting in back-to-work legislation being passed by the Canadian parliament.

In 2007, Canada Post was able to sign a 4-year agreement with CUPW without any labour disruptions.  For 2007, 2008, and 2009 the corporation was named one of Canada's Top 100 Employers, as published in Maclean's magazine.  In 2008, however, it endured a long strike by its administrative worker union — Public Service Alliance of Canada (PSAC) - which compromised customer service.

Nearly all Canada Post employees who are not in the CUPW belong to one of three smaller trade unions.  The Canadian Postmasters and Assistants Association covers 12,000 rural workers, the Association of Postal Officials of Canada has 3,400 supervisors and the Union of Postal Communications Employees represents 2,600 technical workers.

On June 2, 2011, a labour action involving rotating strikes (the first strike to affect Canada Post in 14 years) commenced with CUPW members striking in Winnipeg, Manitoba and in Hamilton, Ontario on June 3. On June 14, 2011, Canada Post management locked out CUPW members, marking the 20th work stoppage in the 46-year relationship between CUPW and Canada Post.  Back to work legislation was passed in the Canadian Legislature which also mandated arbitration by a government-appointed arbitrator. This back to work legislation was challenged in court by CUPW for violating their constitutional right to strike. CUPW won this case in 2016 and the back to work legislation was ruled in violation of the constitution by the Superior Court of Ontario. However, following the legislation, a new collective agreement was signed in 2012 which included major concessions by the employees, such as a $4 per hour reduction in starting wages and the complete elimination of bankable sick days Since this agreement was signed and agreed to by the membership of CUPW, the court ruling on the back to work legislation was of no effect.

In 2016, Canada Post and CUPW negotiated a two-year agreement without a labour disruption. This agreement expired January 31, 2018.

Starting October 22, 2018, Canada Post workers have organized rotating strikes nationwide, the major friction points being major processing centers, including Toronto and Richmond. In mid-November, annual Black Friday and Cyber Monday online purchases, and even Christmas holiday deliveries, appeared at risk. With a 30-day backlog of mail stored in 600 trailers at distribution centers, CP appealed to the 190 Universal Postal Union (UPU) countries to hold Canada-bound mail.

Modernization

Moya Greene, former Canada Post CEO, was quoted as saying that years of under-investment to improve the company had hurt its efficiency and its financial performance. In September 2007, she estimated that modernizing the corporation would cost $2.7 billion over five to seven years for new buildings, equipment, technology and training.

The initiative, called Postal Transformation, has been rolled out across the country from 2010 to 2017. The transformation saw a fundamental change in the work duties of letter carriers. Previously, the delivery of parcels, clearance and transfers to retail postal outlets and collection of mail from street letter boxes was carried out by the separate position of a mail service courier, while letter carriers delivered the mail through walking routes, utilizing public transit and taxis to travel to their work locations. Today, many letter carrier routes are motorized and they are responsible for delivering parcels, mail, clearing and transfers at retail postal outlets, and collection of mail from street letter boxes. The additional duties have led to increased overtime, work stress, and injuries to employees who are facing greater fatigue and delivering mail in the dark; with many complaining that regular routes can no longer be completed in 8 hours, resulting in forced overtime and undelivered mail.

Profitability
For 16 years until 2011, Canada Post realized an annual profit, and it has since had several profitable years. In 2011, Canada Post posted a pretax loss of $253 million, due in part to a 25-day employee lockout, and a $150 million pay equity class action lawsuit. In 2012, Canada Post rebounded to post a profit of $98 million before tax. In 2013, Canada Post lost $37 million overall. The Canada Post group's gross profit in 2014 was $269 million. In 2015, the corporation continued to remain profitable, posting a $136 million profit before tax. In 2016, Canada Post recorded its 3rd consecutive profitable year, making $114 million before tax ($81 million after taxes). In total, Canada Post has made a net profit of $266 million since 2012. In 2017, the Corporation posted $144 million after tax profit.

In 2018: "Canada Post is reporting a loss before tax of $270 million for 2018. Three main non-recurring items factor into the result: the $280 million cost of resolving pay equity and the estimated $135 million net impact of the labour disruption in the fall, partially offset by a $48 million gain after an actuarial update to workers compensation liabilities. Had it not been for these non-recurring factors, Canada Post would have recorded a profit in 2018."

asterisk indicates year with labour disruption and pay equity lawsuit

Rural mail
Safety of rural mobile delivery personnel on busy roads has been an ongoing concern. Canada Post launched the Rural Mail Safety Review as rural and suburban mail carriers across the country, supported by their union, raised complaints about workplace safety. As of March 2008, there have been more than 1,400 such complaints. In some cases, the union staged protests in delivering mail, even after Canada Post tests showed there was no undue traffic safety risk at a particular mail box. Such cases were referred to Labour Canada, who in several instances asked Canada Post to cease delivery to mailboxes. In December 2006, the Canadian government ordered that Canada Post maintain rural delivery wherever possible. On January 1, 2004, rural route contractors became employees of Canada Post and joined the Canadian Union of Postal Workers.

Letters to Santa Claus
Canada Post receives millions of letters addressed to Santa Claus each year, with a special dedicated postal code, H0H 0H0.  About 15,000 current and retired employees respond in many languages to each letter received on behalf of Santa.  Over the past 27 years, more than 15 million letters were written by volunteers.

In 2001, Canada Post started accepting e-mail messages to Santa.  In 2006, more than 44,000 email messages were responded to.

In 1974, three Canada Post employees started to respond to mail addressed to Santa in Montreal, Quebec.  In 1982, Canada Post rolled out the initiative across Canada and pledged that every letter sent in would receive a reply. A stamp is not required when sending a letter to Santa Claus. Canada Post also receives letters to God and, on occasion, the Easter Bunny.

See also
List of postal entities
Postal Union of the Americas, Spain and Portugal
Royal Philatelic Society of Canada

References

Bibliography

External links

Lettermail Delivery Standards Grid (see Table 9)
Priority™ Delivery Standards Grid (see Table 12)

Snap Admail from Canada Post
Canadian Postal Archives - History site run by the Government of Canada
Library and Archives Canada - Various links to history of Canada Post websites (Run by the Government of Canada)
(Contains reference articles on Canadian Stamps)
Website shows way to stop Canada Post junk mail
Red Dot Campaign - website to stop junk mail

London Mail Processing Plant history

 
Canadian federal Crown corporations
Companies based in Ottawa
Federal departments and agencies of Canada
Philately of Canada
Postal organizations
Transport companies established in 1867
1867 establishments in Canada
Uniformed services of Canada